HMS Carnatic was a 74-gun third rate ship of the line of the Royal Navy, launched on 21 October 1823 at Portsmouth Dockyard.

Carnatic was hulked in 1860, and sold out of the navy in 1914.

Notes

References

Lavery, Brian (2003) The Ship of the Line - Volume 1: The development of the battlefleet 1650-1850. Conway Maritime Press. .

Ships of the line of the Royal Navy
Ships built in Portsmouth
1823 ships